Yogendra Upadhyaya is an Indian politician and member of the 18th Uttar Pradesh Assembly and was also 16th Legislative Assembly of Uttar Pradesh. Upadhyaya is a member of the Bharatiya Janata Party and represented Agra South constituency of Uttar Pradesh.

Early life and education
Yogendra Upadhyaya was born in Agra, Uttar Pradesh in 1955. Upadhyaya is a Brahmin. He holds post-graduate and LL.B. degrees (alma mater not known).

Political career
Yogendra Upadhyaya has been a MLA third time in a row (incumbent). He represents Agra South (Assembly constituency) and is a member of the Bharatiya Janata Party.

Posts Held

See also

 Agra South
 Uttar Pradesh Legislative Assembly
 16th Legislative Assembly of Uttar Pradesh
 Politics of India
 Bharatiya Janata Party

References

People from Agra district
Uttar Pradesh MLAs 2012–2017
Living people
1955 births
Bharatiya Janata Party politicians from Uttar Pradesh
Uttar Pradesh MLAs 2017–2022
Politicians from Agra
Uttar Pradesh MLAs 2022–2027